This is a list of the weekly Canadian RPM magazine number one Top Singles chart of 1976.

See also
1976 in music

List of Billboard Hot 100 number ones of 1976
List of Cashbox Top 100 number-one singles of 1976

References
Notes

External links
 Read about RPM Magazine at the AV Trust
 Search RPM charts here at Library and Archives Canada

RPM number-one singles
Canada Singles
1976